The 2021 Super2 & Super3 Series was an Australian motor racing competition for Supercars, which is being staged as a support series to the 2021 Supercars Championship. It was the twenty-second running of the Supercars Development Series, the second tier of competition in Supercars racing. 2021 saw Super3 entries competing alongside Super2 Series cars as a class for the first time within the series which also marked at the same time as the fourteenth running of the Super3 Series itself (Formerly the Kumho Tyre V8 Touring Car Series before officially becoming a third-tier Supercars Series in 2019 as the Kumho Tyre Super3 Series).

Broc Feeney won the Super2 Series championship.

Matt McLean won the Rookie of Year.

Matt McLean won the Mike Kable Young Gun Award.

Declan Fraser retired from the final round after a big crash in Practice 2.

Angelo Mouzouris retired from the final round after a big crash in Qualifying 2.

Nash Morris won the Super3 Series championship with a race to spare.

Entries

Classes

Entries List
The following teams and drivers were competing in the 2021 series.

Super3 
The category was open to post 1993 V8 Supercars allowing Ford Falcon EF to FG and Holden Commodore VP to VE2.

Team changes 
 Triple Eight Race Engineering returned to running a two car operation after one year entering a single car. 
 Matt Stone Racing returned to the category after a one-year absence. 
 MW Motorsport scaled up to a four car operation after purchasing an ex-Kelly Racing Nissan Altima.

Driver changes 
Broc Feeney left Tickford Racing and joined Triple Eight Race Engineering. 
Zak Best left MW Motorsport to join Tickford Racing
Aaron Seton, the son of former Supercars Champion Glenn Seton, joined the championship with Matt Stone Racing.
Jaylyn Robotham graduated to the series with Image Racing to replace Will Brown who graduated to the Supercars Championship.
Bradley Neill joined the championship with Eggleston Motorsport driving his own ex-Holden Racing Team VF Commodore.
Tyler Everingham returned to MW Motorsport after one year with Anderson Motorsport. He will be partnered by Josh Fife, who left Brad Jones Racing to join; and by Declan Fraser, who will make his championship début.
Jack Sipp and Matt McLean graduated to the series with Eggleston Motorsport.

Mid Season Changes 
Tim Blanchard drove a third Eggleston Motorsport Holden VF Commodore for Round 2, 4 & 5.
Jack Perkins took over driving duties in Bradley Neill's ex-HRT Holden VF Commodore due to Neil having to step down due to his fight with cancer.
Tony D'Alberto replaced Jack Sipp for Round 4 due to the Queensland Border Restrictions.
Josh Fife joined Eggleston Motorsport for Round 5 to took over No. 38 Holden VF Commodore from Tony D'Alberto as Jack Sipp due to the Queensland Border Restrictions.

Calendar 
The calendar for the 2021 championship consisted of five rounds:

Results and standings

Season summary

Super2 Series

Super3 Series

Series standings

Points system
Points were awarded for each race at an event, to the driver of a car that completed at least 75% of the race distance and was running at the completion of the race. At least 50% of the planned race distance must be completed for the result to be valid and championship points awarded. The following points scales apply to both the Super2 and Super3 Series.

Super2 Series

Super3 Series

Notes

References 

Supercars Development Series
Super2